The 2008 congressional elections in Kentucky were held on November 4, 2008, to determine who would represent the state of Kentucky in the United States House of Representatives. Kentucky has six seats in the House, apportioned according to the 2000 United States Census. Representatives are elected for two-year terms; those elected will serve in the 111th Congress from January 4, 2009, until January 3, 2011.  The election coincides with the 2008 U.S. presidential election.

The deadline to file to run in the election was January 29, 2008. The primary for both parties took place on May 20, 2008. The current delegation consists of 2 Democrats and 4 Republicans.

All incumbents ran for and won reelection.

Overview

Match-up summary

District breakdown

District 1

This district is in Western Kentucky. The seat has been held by Republican Ed Whitfield since 1995. Heather A. Ryan of Paducah, a self-described Democratic activist, has no primary opposition and will face Whitfield in the general election. CQ Politics forecasts the race as 'Safe Republican'.

Ryan, a Navy veteran and former movie theater manager, launched into the news in January 2008. On January 15, she protested a visit by Mitch McConnell to the non-profit theater where she worked. The theater was raising funds for an expansion and some would potentially come from McConnell. Three days later, the theater's board of directors told her to stay quiet about politics while running the theater. After questioning the request, she was fired.

Whitfield declined to debate Ryan before the election. Whitfield won the election with 64% of the vote.
 Race ranking and details from CQ Politics
 Campaign contributions from OpenSecrets

District 2

This district is in Western-central Kentucky. Republican state senator Brett Guthrie won against Democratic state senator David Boswell. CQ Politics forecasted the race as 'Leans Republican'.

In a surprise decision on the filing deadline, Republican incumbent Ron Lewis, who had held the seat since 1994, announced he would not run for re-election in 2008. It was believed that he intended to be succeeded by his chief of staff, Daniel London.  However, State Senator Brett Guthrie learned of Lewis' retirement just before the deadline, and filed himself.  After Guthrie won some key endorsements, London withdrew from the race. leaving Guthrie unopposed for the Republican nomination. State Senator David Boswell defeated Daviess County judge executive Reid Hare to win the Democratic nomination.

Guthrie won the election with 53% of the vote.
 Race ranking and details from CQ Politics
 Campaign contributions from OpenSecrets
 Guthrie (R) vs Boswell (D-i) graph of collected poll results from Pollster.com

Opinion polls

District 3

Democratic incumbent John Yarmuth won against Republican nominee Anne Northup, who had held the seat previously. CQ Politics forecasted the race as 'Leans Democratic'.

Background and primary

This district consists of Louisville and most of its Jefferson County suburbs. The seat had been held by Northup from 1996 through 2006, when she was defeated by Yarmuth in a year in which Democrats regained control of the house, partially due to the unpopularity of the war in Iraq.

On January 28, 2008, Northup announced she would run for her old congressional seat in the 2008 election. She had previously endorsed Louisville lawyer Erwin Roberts, who had planned to run, and helped raise money for him. However, Roberts withdrew from the race after learning he would likely be called to active duty in the U.S. Army Reserve. Bob DeVore Jr., activist Corley C. Everett and developer Chris Thieneman filed to run in the Republican primary.

Thieneman, who spearheaded a successful campaign to defeat a Jefferson County library tax referendum in 2007 and ran unsuccessfully for Jefferson County Clerk in 2002, dropped out of the race on January 31, declared a return to the Democratic Party, and endorsed John Yarmuth in the election. Theineman said he had been pressured to drop out by people associated with Northup and Kentucky's senior senator Mitch McConnell, but McConnell and Northup denied they had tried to influence Thieneman. Thieneman subsequently reaffirmed he was a Republican, revoked his endorsement of Yarmuth, and unsuspended his campaign. Everett dropped out less than a week before the primary and endorsed Theineman.

Northup won the Republican primary on May 20. Yarmuth was not opposed in the Democratic primary.

General election

At a press conference held in front of a gas station on June 17, 2008, Northup claimed that the 2008 elections were about the rising price of energy. Over a five-day period in September, Yarmuth's campaign headquarters was broken into twice. The thieves took only computers and storage supplies, leaving behind cash and other valuables.

Northup reminded voters of her accomplishments during her years in office, claimed that she was better suited to get results in the long-delayed effort to build an east end bridge and, as she had often done, argued her opponent was too liberal for voters. A key issue in the election was funding for a Veterans Administration hospital to replace the aging one in Louisville; Yarmuth touted a commitment he and Mitch McConnell secured from the Department of Veterans Affairs to spend at least $60 million on the project, while Northup attempted to downplay the merits of the commitment. Northup also attacked Yarmuth for his eventual vote in favor of the bailout. Yarmuth did not run any attack ads, and generally focused his campaign on informing voters of his accomplishments during his term in the House.

The district's daily newspaper, the Courier-Journal, endorsed Yarmuth on October 25, saying the Democrat had done "an exceptionally good job as a freshman representative, winning widespread recognition as one of the brightest new stars in Congress."

Yarmuth won the election with 59% of the vote.
 Race ranking and details from CQ Politics
 Campaign contributions from OpenSecrets
 Northup (R) vs Yarmuth (D-i) graph of collected poll results from Pollster.com

Opinion polls

District 4

This district is a long district in Northern Kentucky that follows the Ohio River. The majority of the voters live in the booming largely white and suburban Cincinnati counties of Boone, Kenton and Campbell. CQ Politics forecasted the race as 'Safe Republican'.
Davis won the election with 63% of the vote.

District 5

This district is in Eastern Kentucky. It has been held by Republican Hal Rogers since 1981. He has filed to run for re-election in 2008. He was opposed by Independent Jim Holbert. CQ Politics forecasted the race as 'Safe Republican'.

Rogers won the election with 84% of the vote.
 Race ranking and details from CQ Politics
 Campaign contributions from OpenSecrets

District 6

This district is located in central Kentucky. It contains the cities of Lexington (including its suburbs), Danville, and Frankfort, the state capital. Democrat Ben Chandler has held the seat since 2004. He faced Republican Lexington attorney Jon Larson in the general election.
CQ Politics forecasted the race as 'Safe Democrat'.

Chandler won the election with 65% of the vote.
 Race ranking and details from CQ Politics
 Campaign contributions from OpenSecrets

See also

 United States House of Representatives elections, 2008

References

External links
 Kentucky State Board of Elections
 U.S. Congress candidates for Kentucky at Project Vote Smart
  from 2008 Race Tracker
 Campaign contributions for Kentucky congressional races from OpenSecrets

2008
Kentucky
United States House of Representatives